Old Songs New Songs is a budget-priced compilation album by the British progressive rock band Family, released in March 1971.  The title is taken from the title of a song that appeared on the band's 1968 debut album Music in a Doll's House, although that song does not appear on this record.

Highlights of this package were songs previously released on 45rpm records only (marked by an asterisk) and four tracks from the sessions of their second album "Family Entertainment" partially re-recorded and remixed for this release.  Those four tracks are: "Observations From a Hill" with Roger Chapman on lead vocals, rather than Jim King as featured on the original release, "Hung Up Down", "Weaver's Answer" and the single B-side "Hometown".  Roger Chapman and Charlie Whitney were quoted in ZigZag magazine (reprinted in both the interview anthology book "The Road To Rock", and also the "Old Songs New Songs" cd box set which includes this album) stating how they disliked the mix of the album Family Entertainment, where most of these songs originally appeared.  So they re-recorded a number of vocals and elements and remixed those tracks for this release.

The album sleeve is the same both sides only the front is positive and the rear in negative black and white. Designed by Stuart Weston.

It was released as a stereo album on the Reprise label (RMP 9007) at a special low price, Tony Gourvish had replaced John Gilbert as manager and Gilbert's old Dukeslodge management company had been replaced by the new Bradgate Bush company.  The album was not issued in the US, although it was a popular import.

In Argentina the album was released with a different tracklist.

Track listing
All tracks written by John "Charlie" Whitney and Roger Chapman except where noted.

 Note: "Peace Of Mind" is incorrectly listed as 3:00 on the original LP label.

Personnel
John Weider - bass, violin
John Whitney - guitar
Poli Palmer - keyboards
Rob Townsend - drums, percussion
Roger Chapman - vocals
Ric Grech - bass, cello
Jim King - saxophone, harmonica

References

1971 compilation albums
Family (band) albums
Reprise Records compilation albums